The Tumult of Aranjuez was an uprising led against King Charles IV that took place in the town of Aranjuez, Spain, on 17–19 March 1808. The event, which is celebrated annually in the first week of September, commemorates the fall of the monarch and the subsequent accession of his son Ferdinand VII. It is celebrated in September rather than in March as the revived celebrations in Aranjuez that began in 1988 were added on top of pre-existing September festivals.

The revolt was instigated by disgruntled citizens and by Ferdinand's supporters.

Causes of the Tumult 
Before the mutiny, Charles IV's valido, or prime minister, Manuel de Godoy, a former member of the Royal Guard, had become unpopular among both the nobles and the Spanish people.

The nobility resented how Godoy had attained power even though he was born in poverty and obscurity. Most notable among them was the King's own son Ferdinand, who had led the El Escorial Conspiracy a few months earlier. The people were upset about Godoy's ambitious nature, his flirting with many women of the court and his willingness to have Catholic Spain make treaties with atheist Revolutionary France against Christian (though Anglican) Great Britain.

Another important factor was the economic crisis affecting the country, which was heightened after Spain lost its navy in the Battle of Trafalgar in 1805. This had impaired trade with the United States, causing food shortages and affecting industrial production.

In addition, under the terms of the Treaty of Fontainebleau, the King and Godoy had allowed French Emperor Napoleon's troops to cross Spain to attack Portugal. This move was extremely unpopular with the Spanish people, who saw the entry as a humiliating invasion, which it soon became. French troops rapidly occupied the important cities of San Sebastián, Pamplona, and Barcelona, fuelling Spanish resentment towards Godoy.

Mutiny 
Soldiers, peasants, and members of the general public assaulted Godoy's quarters and captured him. The mutineers made King Charles dismiss Godoy, and, two days later, the court forced the King himself to abdicate in favor of his son and rival, who became King Ferdinand VII.

Aftermath 
In 1808 Napoleon, under the false pretense of resolving the conflict, invited both Charles IV and Ferdinand VII to Bayonne, France. Both were afraid of the French ruler's power and thought it appropriate to accept the invitation. However, once in Bayonne, Napoleon forced them both to renounce the throne and grant it to himself. The Emperor then named his brother Joseph Bonaparte king of Spain. This episode is known as the Abdications of Bayonne, or Abdicaciones de Bayona in Spanish.

See also 
 Timeline of the Peninsular War

References

External links 
 

1808 in Spain
Conflicts in 1808
Charles IV of Spain
Rebellions in Spain
History of the Community of Madrid
Mutinies
Peninsular War
Aranjuez
March 1808 events